Ptychodes taeniotoides is a species of flat-faced longhorn beetles in the subfamily Lamiinae.

Description

Subspecies
 Ptychodes taeniotoides niveisparsis Bates, 1872
 Ptychodes taeniotoides taeniotoides Thomson, 1865

Distribution
This species can be found in Brazil and Colombia.

References

Lamiini